Gobbler Getaway is a Sally Corporation-manufactured interactive dark ride located in Santa Claus, Indiana, at the Holiday World theme park, in the park's newest section, Thanksgiving. The ride is centered on the fictional Jamestown-evoking "Autumn Falls". where the residents, presented as Pilgrim Fathers, must gather turkeys for the year's thanksgiving. Guests are equipped with "turkey callers" they use to tag birds as they pass through the town and its environs. At the conclusion of the ride, guests' scores are tallied up, and a winner is decided between the four guests in each vehicle, called "trotters".

References

Holiday World & Splashin' Safari